The 1931 Kansas Jayhawks football team represented the University of Kansas in the Big Six Conference during the 1931 college football season. In their fourth season under head coach Bill Hargiss, the Jayhawks compiled a 5–5 record (1–3 against conference opponents), finished in fourth place in the conference, and outscored opponents by a combined total of 112 to 54. They played their home games at Memorial Stadium in Lawrence, Kansas. Otto Rost was the team captain.

Schedule

References

Kansas
Kansas Jayhawks football seasons
Kansas Jayhawks football